Podor Airport is an airport serving Podor, a town in the Saint-Louis Region of Senegal. Podor is located on Morfil Island between the Sénégal River and Doué River.

References

External links
 
 

Airports in Senegal
Saint-Louis Region